Jawan Singh was the first Member of the Legislative Assembly elected from the Sirohi constituency of Rajasthan, India. He was elected in 1951.

References 

Year of birth missing
Possibly living people
Rajasthan MLAs 1952–1957
People from Sirohi district
Independent politicians in India